Kent Acres is a census-designated place (CDP) in Kent County, Delaware, United States. It is part of the Dover, Delaware Metropolitan Statistical Area. The population was 1,890 at the 2010 census.

Geography

Demographics

As of the census of 2000, there were 1,637 people, 649 households, and 460 families residing in the CDP. The racial makeup of the CDP was 73.55% White, 19.85% African American, 0.12% Native American, 1.47% Asian, 2.02% from other races, and 2.99% from two or more races. Hispanic or Latino of any race were 4.58% of the population.

There were 649 households, out of which 33.1% had children under the age of 18 living with them, 49.9% were married couples living together, 16.0% had a female householder with no husband present, and 29.0% were non-families. 23.7% of all households were made up of individuals, and 8.5% had someone living alone who was 65 years of age or older.  The average household size was 2.52 and the average family size was 2.96.

In the CDP, the population was spread out, with 26.8% under the age of 18, 6.1% from 18 to 24, 30.6% from 25 to 44, 23.0% from 45 to 64, and 13.5% who were 65 years of age or older.  The median age was 37 years. For every 100 females, there were 91.9 males.  For every 100 females age 18 and over, there were 87.1 males.

The median income for a household in the CDP was $43,261, and the median income for a family was $47,692. Males had a median income of $33,967 versus $23,393 for females. The per capita income for the CDP was $18,576.  About 7.7% of families and 12.3% of the population were below the poverty line, including 19.2% of those under age 18 and 9.9% of those age 65 or over.

Education
Kent Acres is located in the Caesar Rodney School District. Residents are zoned to W. Reilly Brown Elementary School in Dover, and in turn those zoned to Brown are zoned to Fred Fifer III Middle School in Camden. Caesar Rodney High School in Camden is the comprehensive high school for the entire district.

References

Census-designated places in Kent County, Delaware
Census-designated places in Delaware